Thomas E. Kunkel is a United States Air Force major general who is the commander of the NATO Airborne Early Warning and Control Force. He was previously the deputy director for operations of the Joint Staff.

References

Living people
Place of birth missing (living people)
Recipients of the Defense Superior Service Medal
Recipients of the Distinguished Flying Cross (United States)
Recipients of the Legion of Merit
United States Air Force generals
United States Air Force personnel of the Iraq War
United States Air Force personnel of the War in Afghanistan (2001–2021)
Year of birth missing (living people)